Chevalier de Clavières (Guérande, 17 February 1738 — )   was a French Navy officer. He fought in the War of American Independence, and taking part in the French operations in the Indian Ocean under Suffren.

Biography 
Kerhué joined the Navy as a Garde-Marine on 7 October 1756. He was promoted to Lieutenant on 4 April 1777. 

In 1778, he served as first officer on the 74-gun Hector, part of the fleet under Admiral d'Estaing. 

He commanded the 74-gun Argonaute in the Cuddalore on 20 June 1783.  Suffren was pleased with his performance and recommended him for a 1000-livre pension. 

After the war, he was amongst the captains that Suffren recommended for promotion He received a 600-livre pension in recognition of his service.

Sources and references 
 Notes

References

 Bibliography
 
 

French Navy officers